Begonia hemsleyana is a species of plant in the family Begoniaceae. It is endemic to China and has a tuber.

References

hemsleyana
Endemic flora of China
Vulnerable plants
Taxonomy articles created by Polbot
Taxa named by Joseph Dalton Hooker